Rathscar is a Central Victorian locality. Gold was mined in the area. The area to the east of the Avoca River known as Rathscar West was surveyed in 1899.  Rathscar straddles both the Pyrenees Shire and the Shire of Central Goldfields.

Gold mining
The Melbourne newspaper The Argus reported in 1903 that a new gold-bearing reef had been discovered in Rathscar.

People
The "largest landholder and possibly the wealthiest" in the area was Charles Wilson from Sunny Park ( Coordinates  ).  Wilson's daughter Maude Wilson married John Miller in 1901 at Sunny Park and they then lived in the Rathscar district where their four children were born.

Property
There was a Primary School (Numbered 1535) at Rathscar West.

 Rathscar West had a Methodist church, initially constructed in timber and built around 1870. As well as the Sunday services, the church hosted a number of activities including concerts, harvest festivals and Sunday School picnics.

The timber building was replaced by brick church (recycled from the former Methodist Church / Wesleyan Chapel Homebush - 6 km away) in 1928. In 2018, this former Rathcar West church building is now privately owned.

The Pyrenees Shire Council has documented a number of buildings in Rathscar including the Methodist Church, the Avonlea Farm House and the Elliot farm complex, in the Avoca Heritage Study: 1864 - 1994 - Volume 3.

See also
 Bung Bong, Victoria
 Homebush, Victoria
 List of localities in the Shire of Central Goldfields
 List of locations in the Shire of Pyrenees
 Wareek, Victoria

References

External links
  Avoca and District Historical Society
  Don't go down the mine (the song sung at the Rathscar Methodist church concert in 1915).

Towns in Victoria (Australia)